The following lists events that happened during 1910 in the Austro-Hungarian Empire.

Events

February
 February 26 - Austria-Hungary grants "most favored nation" status to the United States.

March
 March 18 - Austria-Hungary signs an agreement with Russia to restore full diplomatic relations.
 March 27 - A fire starts during a barn-dance in Ököritófülpös kills 312 people.

References

 
1910s in Austria-Hungary
Years of the 20th century in Austria-Hungary